A Perfect World is a 1993 American crime drama film directed by Clint Eastwood. It stars Kevin Costner as an escaped convict who takes a young boy (T. J. Lowther) hostage and attempts to escape on the road with the child. Eastwood co-stars as a Texas Ranger in pursuit of the convict.

Though the film was not a box-office success in North America and grossed only $31 million for its November 1993 release, it managed to gross $104 million overseas for a total of $135 million worldwide. The film received critical acclaim for its acting (particularly from Kevin Costner), directing, editing, themes, cinematography and musical score. It's also considered by some critics and fans as one of Eastwood's best films.

Plot
In 1963 Texas, convicts Robert "Butch" Haynes and Terry Pugh escape from the state penitentiary in Huntsville. Fleeing, Pugh stumbles into a house where eight-year-old Phillip Perry lives with his devout Jehovah's Witness mother and two sisters. Butch follows, and hits Pugh to make him stop molesting the mother. Needing a hostage to aid their escape, Butch grabs the boy, who meekly accompanies them. The trio's journey soon hits an unpleasant note as Butch kills Terry, following the latter's attempt to harm the child. With his partner out of the way, the convict and his young victim take to the Texas highway in an attempt to flee from the pursuing police.

Meanwhile, Texas Ranger Red Garnett is in pursuit. With criminologist Sally Gerber and FBI sharpshooter Bobby Lee in tow, Red is determined to recover the criminal and the hostage before they cross the Texas border. Also, Red reveals to Sally that he has a personal interest in apprehending Butch alive.  Even though Butch doesn't realize it, Red has a history with him.  When Butch was a teenager, he stole a car, and Red was the arresting officer.  Butch was living with his abusive father, also a criminal, at the time. Due to his age and it being a first offense, Butch was supposed to get a lenient sentence.  Red thought juvenile prison was safer for Butch than home, and muses that some of the kids who went through Gatesville turned out ok, and one even became a priest. He also felt that if Butch had been left at home with his father, he would have a rap sheet "as long as my arm." Red asked the judge to give Butch a harsh sentence. Years later, Red has come to realize that the harsher sentence only encouraged the very life of crime he feared would happen.  Now, Red is hoping that if he can bring Butch in alive, he can redeem himself for his past mistake.

Phillip has never participated in Halloween or Christmas celebrations due to his religion. Escaping with Butch, however, he experiences a freedom which he finds exhilarating, as Butch gladly allows him the kind of indulgences he has been forbidden, including the wearing of a shoplifted Casper the Friendly Ghost costume. Gradually, Phillip becomes increasingly aware of his surroundings, and with constant encouragement from Butch, seems to acquire the ability to make independent decisions on what is wrong and right. Butch slowly finds himself drawn into giving Phillip the kind of fatherly presence which he himself never had.

Butch and Phillip try to make it to New Mexico, but find out that the highway they are driving on is unfinished.  While asleep in their car in a cornfield, they encounter Mack, a farmer, and his family - Lottie his wife, and his grandson Cleveland. Mack frequently abuses Cleveland, which Butch tries to tolerate, but when Mack figures out who he is he puts a stop to it. He beats Mack and plans on killing him, but Phillip picks up Butch's gun and shoots Butch in the stomach. Phillip walks out of the house, drops the gun into a well, throws the car keys away, and runs across a meadow. Butch follows, and rests at the tree Phillip has climbed. In the following dialogue Phillip apologizes for shooting Butch who tells him he did the right thing.

Red's team surrounds the field where Phillip and Butch are situated, and Butch soon sends the boy to his mother, who has arrived by helicopter and who Butch has made promise to take Phillip trick-or-treating every year. Unwilling to leave the already wounded Butch, the boy runs back and hugs him – a gesture which, along with his knowledge of Butch's character and background, convinces Red that he can resolve the situation peacefully. His plans are thwarted, however, when Bobby Lee, mistaking one of Butch's gestures to mean he is about to draw a gun, shoots him in the chest, killing him. The move leaves Red angry and frustrated at his inability to save Butch and take him alive. Red punches Bobby Lee and Sally knees him in the groin before walking away. Phillip is then reunited with his mother, and they fly away in a helicopter while Phillip sadly looks through the window at Butch's lifeless body in the meadow.

Cast

 Kevin Costner as Robert "Butch" Haynes
 Clint Eastwood as Chief "Red" Garnett
 Laura Dern as Sally Gerber
 T. J. Lowther as Philip "Buzz" Perry
 Keith Szarabajka as Terry Pugh
 Leo Burmester as Deputy Tom Adler
 Bruce McGill as Paul Saunders
 Paul Hewitt as Dick Suttle
 Bradley Whitford as FBI Agent Bobby Lee
 Ray McKinnon as Deputy Bradley
 Mary Alice as Lottie
 John M. Jackson as Bob Fielder
 Wayne Dehart as Mack
 Linda Hart as Doreen
 Cameron Finley as Bob Fielder Jr.
 Gil Glasgow as Pete
 Marco Perella as Trooper
 Margaret Bowman as Trick 'r Treat Lady
 James Jeter as Old-Timer

Production
Steven Spielberg was interested in directing the film but was unavailable due to shooting Jurassic Park.

While Eastwood was making In the Line of Fire, he was given the screenplay to A Perfect World. He was also in the midst of campaigning for the Academy Awards with Unforgiven and saw A Perfect World as an opportunity to work as a director only and take a break from acting. However, when Kevin Costner was approached with the screenplay for the movie, he suggested that Eastwood would be perfect for the role of Texas Ranger Red Garnett. Eastwood agreed, realizing that his screentime would not be as significant, leaving most of the time to work behind the camera.

Screenwriter John Lee Hancock said part of the idea for the character of the Phillip and his Casper costume came from a childhood memory he had of his brother running around a Texas field in such a costume.

The film was shot in Austin, Texas, and Martindale, Texas, in between San Marcos and Lockhart in the spring and summer of 1993.

Reception

Box office 
A Perfect World was released in North American theaters on November 24, 1993, grossing $31.1 million in box office receipts in the United States and Canada. The film's success was far better overseas, with an international gross of $102.5 million for a total of $135 million.

Critical response 
The film has a 79% score on Rotten Tomatoes based on 33 reviews. The site's critical consensus states, "Despite some formulaic touches, Clint Eastwood's haunting, ambiguous crime drama is smart and gritty, and features a bravura performance from Kevin Costner as a prison escapee on the run". On Metacritic, the film has a weighted average score of 71 out of 100,  indicating "generally favorable reviews".

Positive reviews praised the film for its emotional depth and accurate depiction of the psychology of hostage situations. Critics argued Kevin Costner's subtly nuanced portrayal of the escaped convict Butch Haynes forms the cornerstone of the film's success and is one of the actor's finest performances. Roger Ebert of the Chicago Sun-Times called it "a film any director alive might be proud to sign," while The New York Times hailed it as "a deeply felt, deceptively simple film that marks the high point of Mr. Eastwood's directing career thus far."

Though praise was given to Costner's performance, some critics cited the film's length and "rambling" nature as drawbacks. Owen Gleiberman of Entertainment Weekly wrote, "Costner seems about as pathological as a koala bear, and his gentle charisma reinforces the film’s touchy-feely theme," and that "the trouble with Eastwood’s attempt to make a thriller with 'heart' is that, in retreating from his darker impulses, he muffles his own voice as a moviemaker. Of all directors, he should know that a character like Butch can’t be this easily forgiven." Desson Howe of The Washington Post said, "Within its narrow, unambitious, commercial boundaries, the movie is highly watchable," but disjointed story-wise.

In the years since its release, the film has been acclaimed by critics as one of Eastwood's most satisfying and underrated directorial achievements, and the scenes between the convict (Costner) and his young captive (Lowther) have been acknowledged as some of the most delicately crafted sequences in all of Eastwood's body of work. In 2021, Liam Gaughan of Collider praised the film for its examination of masculinity, writing, "Eastwood’s films are frequently under fire for their political baggage, but A Perfect World doesn’t lionize its characters or offer an easy solution. It presents a slice of reality, and the flawed characters forced to inhabit it."

Cahiers du Cinéma selected A Perfect World as the best film of 1993.

References

Bibliography

External links
 
 
 

1993 films
1993 crime drama films
1990s drama road movies
American crime drama films
American drama road movies
Films directed by Clint Eastwood
Films produced by Clint Eastwood
Films about child abduction in the United States
Films about friendship
Films set in Texas
Films shot in Texas
Films shot in South Carolina
Films set in 1963
Films about hostage takings
Malpaso Productions films
Warner Bros. films
Films scored by Lennie Niehaus
Films produced by David Valdes
1990s English-language films
1990s American films